Konk or KONK may refer to:

 KONK (AM), a community radio station (1630 AM) in Key West, Florida, United States
 Konk (album), an album by The Kooks
 Konk (band), a 1980s band
 Konk (recording studio), the recording studio and record label owned by The Kinks
 Konk, a character from The Pirates of Dark Water
 Conk, a hair straightener gel